The 1907 Pittsburgh Pirates season was the 26th season for the Pittsburgh Pirates franchise. It involved the Pirates finishing second in the National League.

The offense was led by Tommy Leach and Hall of Famers Honus Wagner and Fred Clarke. Wagner led the NL in batting average, on-base percentage, slugging percentage, and stolen bases. The Pirates scored the most runs of any team.

Regular season

Season standings

Record vs. opponents

Opening Day lineup

Roster

Player stats

Batting

Starters by position 
Note: Pos = Position; G = Games played; AB = At bats; H = Hits; Avg. = Batting average; HR = Home runs; RBI = Runs batted in

Other batters 
Note: G = Games played; AB = At bats; H = Hits; Avg. = Batting average; HR = Home runs; RBI = Runs batted in

Pitching

Starting pitchers 
Note: G = Games pitched; IP = Innings pitched; W = Wins; L = Losses; ERA = Earned run average; SO = Strikeouts

Other pitchers 
Note: G = Games pitched; IP = Innings pitched; W = Wins; L = Losses; ERA = Earned run average; SO = Strikeouts

Relief pitchers 
Note: G = Games pitched; W = Wins; L = Losses; SV = Saves; ERA = Earned run average; SO = Strikeouts

Awards and honors

League top five finishers 
League leaders in bold

 Ed Abbaticchio: #2 runs batted in (82)
 Fred Clarke: #4 runs scored (97)
 Fred Clarke: #5 on-base percentage (.383)
 Tommy Leach: #2 runs scored (102)
 Tommy Leach: #4 batting average (.303)
 Tommy Leach: #4 stolen bases (43)
 Sam Leever: #4 earned run average (1.66)
 Lefty Leifield: #5 wins (20)
 Honus Wagner: #1 batting average (.350)
 Honus Wagner: #1 stolen bases (61)
 Honus Wagner: #1 on-base percentage (.408)
 Honus Wagner: #1 slugging percentage (.513)
 Honus Wagner: #2 runs batted in (82)
 Honus Wagner: #3 runs scored (98)
 Vic Willis: #4 wins (21)

Notes

References 

 1907 Pittsburgh Pirates team page at Baseball Reference
 1907 Pittsburgh Pirates Page at Baseball Almanac

Pittsburgh Pirates seasons
Pittsburgh Pirates season
Pittsburg Pir